Thomas Hansen may refer to:

 Tom Hansen (Nebraska politician) (born 1946), state legislator
 Tom Hansen (South Dakota politician) (born 1939), member of the South Dakota House of Representatives
 Thomas Blom Hansen (born 1958), Danish anthropologist
 Thomas Hansen (captain) (1762–1837), master of the first mission ship to New Zealand
 Thomas Hansen (musician) (1976–2007), Norwegian artist, known as Saint Thomas

Sportspeople
 Tom Hansen (athlete) (born 1948), Danish runner 
 Tom Hansen (biathlete) (born 1968), Canadian  
 Thomas Hansen (cricketer) (born 1976), Danish cricketer
 Thomas Hansen (footballer) (born 1983), Danish footballer
 Tommy Hansen (footballer)

Characters 
 Tom Hansen, in film (500) Days of Summer
 Tom Hansen, protagonist of the video game Cold Fear

See also
Thomas Hanson (disambiguation)